In the math branches of differential geometry and vector calculus, the second covariant derivative, or the second order covariant derivative, of a vector field is the derivative of its derivative with respect to another two tangent vector fields.

Definition
Formally, given a (pseudo)-Riemannian manifold (M, g) associated with a vector bundle E → M, let ∇ denote the Levi-Civita connection given by the metric g, and denote by Γ(E) the space of the smooth sections of the total space E. Denote by T*M the cotangent bundle of M. Then the second covariant derivative can be defined as the composition of the two ∇s as follows: 

For example, given vector fields u, v, w, a second covariant derivative can be written as

by using abstract index notation. It is also straightforward to verify that

Thus

When the torsion tensor is zero, so that , we   may use this fact to write Riemann curvature tensor as  

Similarly, one may also obtain the second covariant derivative of a function f as

we  find 
.
This can be rewritten as 

so we have 

That is, the value of the second covariant derivative of a function is independent on the order of taking derivatives.

Notes

Tensors in general relativity
Riemannian geometry